Celismar dos Santos Marins (born 1 January 1986), commonly known as Preto, is a Brazilian footballer who plays as goalkeeper for Vitória das Tabocas.

Club career
Born in Salvador, Bahia, Preto started his career with Catuense in 2006. After leaving the club in the following year, he stepped down from football until 2009, returning to action with Rio Bananal.

Preto rarely settled into a club in the following seasons, representing Centro Limoeirense, Viana, URSO, Fast Clube and Mineiros before joining Vitória das Tabocas in August 2012. After impressing with the latter, he returned to Fast after a short stint with Alecrim on 15 February 2013.

On 8 August 2014, Preto was loaned to Bonsucesso. Initially a backup option, he became a regular starter during the 2015 Campeonato Carioca and impressed during a match against Vasco da Gama. After the tournament's end, he signed for Santos and was immediately assigned to the newly formed B-team.

After featuring regularly with the B-side in the Copa Paulista, Preto renewed with Peixe on 17 January 2017, signing until the end of the year.

Career statistics

Honours
Vitória das Tabocas
Campeonato Pernambucano Série A2: 2013

References

External links

1986 births
Living people
Sportspeople from Salvador, Bahia
Brazilian footballers
Association football goalkeepers
Catuense Futebol players
Nacional Fast Clube players
Alecrim Futebol Clube players
Bonsucesso Futebol Clube players
Santos FC players
Rio Bananal Futebol Clube players